Didicas Volcano is an active volcanic island in the province of Cagayan in northern Philippines. The island, which was a submarine volcano and re-emerged from the sea in 1952, is  NE of Camiguin Island, one of the Babuyan Islands in Luzon Strait. Before 1952, the volcano first breached the ocean surface in 1857.

Physical features
It is at the southern end of the Luzon Volcanic Arc, and like all the volcanoes in the Philippines, is part of the Pacific ring of fire.

Eruption history
There have been six historical eruptions recorded from the volcano since the 18th century.

1773: The first recorded submarine eruption from the volcano, on what was known as Didicas reefs of the Farallones.
1856 September or October: The first activity started as a column of "smoke" in between the two rocks well known to the locals, but no earthquakes were felt.
1857: The volcano erupted violently, attended by earthquakes, then broke the surface of the sea. The island was later washed out by the waves and disappeared beneath the sea.
1952: The volcano broke the ocean's surface again during an eruption that started around March 16.
1953: The activities subsided.
1969: First known fatalities from the volcano: three fishermen were killed while fishing near the volcano. The activity, which started on March 21, came from a new crater on the northern side of the island. Activity on the volcano waned in June the same year.
1978 January 6 to 9: The last eruption of Didicas to date.  The mild eruption blanketed the island with fresh volcanic ashes.

See also
List of active volcanoes in the Philippines
List of potentially active volcanoes in the Philippines
List of inactive volcanoes in the Philippines
Philippine Institute of Volcanology and Seismology

References

External links
 "Didicas Volcano Page"  at the Philippine Institute of Volcanology and Seismology (PHIVOLCS).

Stratovolcanoes of the Philippines
Subduction volcanoes
Volcanoes of the Luzon Strait
Mountains of the Philippines
Active volcanoes of the Philippines
Landforms of Cagayan
Holocene stratovolcanoes